Aadu Must (born 25 March 1951 in Pärnu) is an Estonian historian and politician. He has been member of the XI, XII, XIII and XIV Riigikogu.

In 1985 he graduated from University of Tartu in history (PhD). From 1976 he has been a lecturer (since 1997 professor) in Tartu University.

He was a member of Committee of Estonia. He has been the chairman of Tartu City Council (intermittently 2001-2015).

Since 1996 he has been a member of Estonian Central Party.

References

1951 births
20th-century Estonian historians
21st-century Estonian historians
Academic staff of the University of Tartu
Estonian Centre Party politicians
Living people
Members of the Riigikogu, 2003–2007
Members of the Riigikogu, 2007–2011
Members of the Riigikogu, 2011–2015
Members of the Riigikogu, 2015–2019
Members of the Riigikogu, 2019–2023
People from Pärnu
University of Tartu alumni